Simpang Empat or Simpang Ampat is a small town in Kota Setar District, Kedah, Malaysia.

References

Kota Setar District
Towns in Kedah